The Altoona Mirror is a daily newspaper located in Altoona, Pennsylvania. It is the hometown newspaper for Altoona and serves all of Blair County as well as parts of surrounding counties.

History
The newspaper was founded on June 13, 1874 as The Evening Mirror by Harry E. Slep and George J. Akers (Slep & Akers Company).  Akers left the company in 1877, leaving Slep as the sole owner.  Mr. Slep's eldest son, William H. Slep, eventually joined the business and the firm became known as H. & W.H. Slep Company.

In 1888, the newspaper's name was changed to Altoona Mirror.  In 1907, the Slep company name was changed to Mirror Printing Company.  The paper remained in the Slep family until being sold to Thomson Newspapers in 1984.  Under Thomson ownership, a Sunday edition was launched in 1987 and the paper switched its weekday publication to mornings starting in 1997.  The Altoona Mirror was sold to current owner Ogden Newspapers in 1998.

Dan Slep, a fifth-generation descendant of co-founder Harry E. Slep, became publisher in 2021.

Pennsylvania Mirror
A Mirror Printing Company sister newspaper, the Pennsylvania Mirror, was published between 1968 and 1977 and covered news and events in neighboring Centre County.  As a morning paper, it offered an alternative to the State College, Pennsylvania-based Centre Daily Times which was an evening paper.

References

External links

1874 establishments in Pennsylvania
Altoona, Pennsylvania
Daily newspapers published in Pennsylvania
Publications established in 1874